The Five Mountain Sword Schools Alliance is a fictional alliance formed by five "orthodox" martial arts schools in the wuxia novel The Smiling, Proud Wanderer by Jin Yong. The five schools specialise in swordplay and are based on the Five Great Mountains in Taoism: Mount Hua, Mount Tai, (South) Mount Heng, (North) Mount Heng and Mount Song. The alliance was initially established to counter the "evil" Sun Moon Holy Cult. However, as the story progresses, the alliance ultimately disintegrates due to mutual distrust and infighting.

Mount Hua School

Mount Song School 
The Mount Song School is headed by Zuo Lengchan, who is also the nominal chief of the alliance. It is based on the same mountain as the Shaolin School but situated on a different peak. The ambitious and ruthless Zuo Lengchan wishes to consolidate power by intimidating the other four schools to submit to him and merge into the Mount Song School. He sends his spy Lao Denuo to infiltrate the Mount Hua School and steal Yue Buqun's Violet Mist Divine Skill manual, and instigates the exiled Sword faction members of the Mount Hua School to challenge Yue Buqun. He bribes members of the Mount Tai School to turn against their leader Tianmen, who is betrayed and killed by his own men during a special ceremony. Zuo Lengchan also sends his followers to assassinate Dingjing, one of the three leaders of the (North) Mount Heng School. In an earlier chapter of the novel, Zuo Lengchan confronts Liu Zhengfeng of the (South) Mount Heng School during the latter's retirement ceremony to force him to surrender. Zuo Lengchan is eventually defeated by Yue Buqun and blinded. He is killed by Linghu Chong in the final conflict when several swordsmen are lured into a cave and trapped there by Yue Buqun.

Mount Tai School 
The Mount Tai School is affiliated to Taoism and led by Tianmen. Tianmen refuses to comply with Zuo Lengchan so the latter bribes the former's followers to turn against their leader. Tianmen is betrayed and murdered by conspirators during a special ceremony and Yuji is nominated by Zuo Lengchan to succeed Tianmen. The school's best fighters are killed when the four schools are trapped by Yue Buqun in a cave at Mount Hua.

(North) Mount Heng School 
The (North) Mount Heng School is affiliated to Buddhism and headed by the Three Elder Nuns – Dingjing, Dingxian and Dingyi – with Dingxian serving as its leader. Its members are all female and mostly Buddhist nuns. Dingxian refuses to submit to Zuo Lengchan so the latter sends his followers to ambush and assassinate the Three Elder Nuns. Dingjing is killed in an ambush while Dingxian and Dingyi are murdered by Yue Buqun in Shaolin Monastery later. Dingxian names Linghu Chong as the new leader of their school before her death. After taking leadership of the school, Linghu Chong allows the jianghu lowlifes he is acquainted with to join the school. He leads the school well and earns the respect of others.

(South) Mount Heng School 
The (South) Mount Heng School is led by Mo Da, a mysterious swordsman known for playing melancholic tunes on his huqin, where his sword is concealed. Its swordplay techniques are customised to suit musical themes. Mo Da's junior, Liu Zhengfeng, befriends Qu Yang of the Sun Moon Holy Cult. The duo share the same passion for music and they compose the musical piece "Xiaoao Jianghu" together. Zuo Lengchan leads his men to confront Liu Zhengfeng during the latter's retirement ceremony and eventually Liu Zhengfeng commits suicide together with Qu Yang. Mo Da is the sole survivor from the school after Linghu Chong saves the swordsmen trapped by Yue Buqun in a cave.

Notes 

Organizations in Wuxia fiction